was a professional wrestling event promoted by DDT Pro-Wrestling (DDT). It took place on March 20, 2017, in Saitama, Japan, at the Saitama Super Arena. It was the twenty-first event under the Judgement name and the first Judgement event held outside of Tokyo. The event aired domestically on Fighting TV Samurai.

Storylines
Judgement 2017 featured thirteen professional wrestling matches that involved different wrestlers from pre-existing scripted feuds and storylines. Wrestlers portrayed villains, heroes, or less distinguishable characters in the scripted events that built tension and culminated in a wrestling match or series of matches.

Event
The two matches on the undercard were presented respectively by DDT New Attitude and Tokyo Joshi Pro Wrestling, two sub-brands of DDT.

The dark match was a Rumble rules match for both the Ironman Heavymetalweight Championship and the King of Dark Championship, respectively held by Gota Ihashi and a kotatsu table. During the match, Gota Ihashi was eliminated by Mad Paulie, causing Ihashi to retain his title (unlike regular championships, the King of Dark Championship is awarded to the loser of the match). Following a punch by Munenori Sawa, Guanchulo fell on the kotatsu table, scoring a pinfall to become the 1,209th Ironman Heavymetalweight Champion.

After the match, Yoshihiko, a blow-up doll with male make-up, hit Guanchulo with a Superfly Splash and pinned him to become the 1,210th champion.

Next, Team DNA (Kazusada Higuchi, Kouki Iwasaki and Mizuki Watase) unsuccessfully defended the KO-D 6-Man Tag Team Championship against Smile Squash (Soma Takao, Akito and Yasu Urano) and NωA (Makoto Oishi, Shunma Katsumata and Mao), the eventual winners of the bout.

Next was an eight-man tag team match featuring veteran joshi wrestler Jaguar Yokota from the World Women Pro-Wrestling Diana promotion.

After the match, the kotatsu table pinned Yoshihiko to win back the Ironman Heavymetalweight title but was then pinned by Joey Ryan who became the 1,212th champion.

The next match saw the return of Shigehiro Irie and was dubbed "Shigehiro Irie's Triumphal Return Special Singles Match".

Next was a match dubbed "Super Joshi Pro War 2017" that saw the participation of Meiko Satomura from Sendai Girls' Pro Wrestling and Aja Kong from Oz Academy.

The next match was the "Shungo Oyama Pro-Wrestling Challenge" that saw the professional wrestling debut of mixed martial artist Shungo Oyama in a tag team match.

Next was a singles match for the Ironman Heavymetalweight Championship dubbed "Pro Wrestling Tees Presents “DDT Is DDT” 20 Years Entertainment Culmination! The Best In The World Bad Guy Decisive Battle Anal Explosion Deathmatch" between champion Joey Ryan and challenger Danshoku Dino.

Next Yukio Sakaguchi and veteran Masakatsu Funaki defended the KO-D Tag Team Championship against Tetsuya Endo and Shuji Ishikawa representing the Damnation stable.

Next was a match dubbed "Kou Shibusawa's 35th Anniversary - “Nobunaga's Ambition: Our Warring States” Sengoku Warlords Match" celebrating the 35-year career of Kou Shibusawa, creator of many Koei video games such as Nobunaga's Ambition or Romance of the Three Kingdoms. Each participant was dressed as a historical figure of the Sengoku period: in the first team were Sanshiro Takagi as Toyotomi Hideyoshi, Keiji Mutoh as Takeda Shingen and Isami Kodaka as Sanada Yukimura; in the second team were Daisuke Sekimoto as Shibata Katsuie, Jun Akiyama as Uesugi Kenshin and Kota Ibushi as Oda Nobunaga.

Results

Rumble rules match

Footnotes

References

External links
The official DDT Pro-Wrestling website

2017
2017 in professional wrestling
Professional wrestling in Tokyo
Professional wrestling anniversary shows